Melton Prior (12 September 1845 – 2 November 1910), was an English artist and war correspondent for The Illustrated London News from the early 1870s until 1904. Prior was one of the leading illustrators of late Victorian Britain, noted for his ability to quickly sketch scenes.  His pencil sketches were sent back to London where they were re-drawn by studio artists and engraved on wood-blocks for printing in the Saturday issues of the Illustrated London News. In addition to covering conflicts around the world, he also traveled on a number of Royal tours including accompanying the Prince of Wales to Canada in 1901.

Prior was one of two major artists employed by the Illustrated London News, with the other being William Simpson (1823–1899).

Life

Prior was born in Camden Town, London, and studied under his father, William Henry Prior (1812–1882), a landscape artist, painter and illustrator. In 1873, he was contracted by the Illustrated London News to travel to West Africa to cover the Ashanti War. Among the correspondents that Prior rubbed along with in West Africa was G. A. Henty, with whom he had shared a hut on the campaign. Prior produced a drawing of the quarters that the war-correspondents shared and this was a title page illustration for the Illustrated London News on 28 February 1874. This was followed by covering the fighting against the Carlists in Spain before heading to eastern Europe where Prior sketched the events in Herzegovina and the Russo-Turkish War.

South Africa, 1879–1881
In 1879, Prior traveled to Durban to report on the Zulu War which had just broken out. While he missed the events at Isandlwana and Rorke's Drift, he did witness subsequent actions including the final Battle of Ulundi He was also with the group who discovered the body of the Prince Imperial. Although Boer farmers had assisted the British in the war against the Zulus, they resented the encroachment by English farmers and industrialists on their lands, and sought the independence of the Transvaal and Orange Free State. Following the breakdown of negotiations, hostilities broke out, and Prior witnessed the aftermath of the British disaster at Majuba Hill.

North Africa, 1882–1885
The following year, Prior found himself offshore on a Royal Navy ship during the bombardment of Alexandria. Later, he accompanied the British forces under General Sir Garnet Wolseley on the expedition down the Nile which culminated with the destruction of the Egyptian Army at Tel-el-Kebir on 13 September 1882. In 1884–85, he accompanied the relief expedition for General Charles Gordon and was present at the Battle of Abu Klea in the Sudan.

South Africa, 1896–1902
Following the events in Sudan, Prior was sent to the Far East to cover the operations in Burma. The mid-1890s found him back in South Africa, covering the failed Jameson Raid, the Matabele uprising and the subsequent Boer War, although he also covered the campaign in the Tirah on the North-West Frontier of British India in 1897. During the fighting against the Boers, Prior found himself besieged at Ladysmith.

Final years
Prior's last campaigns were the Somaliland Expedition of 1903, and the Russo-Japanese War of 1904–1905. He died in London on 2 November 1910. His body was buried at Hither Green Cemetery. A monument to Melton Prior with a bas-relief portrait exists within the crypt at St Paul's Cathedral in London.

Works by

 Prior, Melton. (1912). Campaigns of a War Correspondent. London: Edward Arnold.

References

 Carruthers, Jane. (1987). Melton Prior. War Artist in Southern Africa 1895 to 1900. Houghton: The Brenthurst Press.

 Harrington, Peter. (1993). British Artists and War: The Face of Battle in Paintings and Prints, 1700–1914. London: Greenhill.
 Hodgson, Pat. The War Illustrators. Reading: Osprey.

External links
Melton Prior  (brighton & Hove museums)
photo on Brown University website
Obituary in NY Times

.

1845 births
1910 deaths
English illustrators
19th-century war artists
British war correspondents
War correspondents of the Russo-Japanese War
People educated at St. Clement Danes School
British war artists